Hymns is the first solo album by Living Colour vocalist Corey Glover, released on LaFace Records on April 7, 1998.

Track listing
"Hymn #1017" (Glover) – 1:02
"Do You First, Then Do Myself" (Lord) – 4:26
"April Rain" (Glover, Lord) – 4:53
"Little Girl" (Glover, Alper, Bodley, Diamond) – 5:10
"Hot Buttered Soul" (Glover, Haime, Lord) – 4:54
"Things Are Getting in the Way" (Glover, Smith) – 4:40
"Sidewalk Angel" (Glover, Haime, Lord, Smith, McCoy) – 4:25
"One" (Glover, Lord) – 4:27
"Sermon" (Glover, Haime, Lord) – 4:53
"Lowball Express" (Glover, Alper, Diamond, Fritz, McCoy, Bodley) – 4:46
"Only Time Will Tell" (Glover, Alper, Diamond, Fritz,  Haime, McCoy) – 5:20
"Silence" (Glover, Diamond) – 5:46

1998 debut albums
Corey Glover albums
LaFace Records albums